A lip frenulum piercing is a body piercing through the frenulum of either the upper or lower lip.  A piercing through the upper lip frenulum is sometimes called a "smiley",,because it is usually only seen when smiling, or a "scrumper". Similarly, the lower lip frenulum piercing is sometimes referred to as a "frowny". Jewelry is recommended to be worn in the piercing for a short period of time because the risks associate with it are high.

Risks
Gum recession, teeth erosion, and teeth enamel damage are possible problems that can arise from lip frenulum piercings as a result of the piercing jewelry, especially if it is a captive bead ring, rubbing against the teeth and gums. Additionally, as with many piercings, infection is a risk, especially if the jewelry is not made of hypoallergenic material. The risk of jewelry migration is particularly high for lip frenulum piercings because the tissue of the lip frenulum is very thin and its area very small.

See also
 Body modification
 Lip piercing

References

Body piercing
Mouth